The 2017–18 season was 22nd consecutive season in the top Ukrainian football league for Vorskla Poltava. Vorskla competed in Premier League and Ukrainian Cup.

Players

Squad information

Transfers

In

Out

Pre-season and friendlies

Competitions

Overall

Premier League

League table

Results summary

Results by round

Matches

Ukrainian Cup

Statistics

Appearances and goals

|-
! colspan=14 style=background:#dcdcdc; text-align:center| Goalkeepers

|-
! colspan=14 style=background:#dcdcdc; text-align:center| Defenders

|-
! colspan=14 style=background:#dcdcdc; text-align:center| Midfielders 

|-
! colspan=14 style=background:#dcdcdc; text-align:center| Forwards

|-
! colspan=14 style=background:#dcdcdc; text-align:center| Players transferred out during the season

Last updated: 20 May 2019

Goalscorers

Last updated: 20 May 2018

Clean sheets

Last updated: 20 May 2018

Disciplinary record

Last updated: 20 May 2018

References

External links 
Official website

Vorskla Poltava
FC Vorskla Poltava seasons